The 2014–15 MSV Duisburg season was the 115th season in the club's football history. In 2014–15 the club played in the 3. Liga, the third tier of German football.

Duisburg was secured promotion to the 2. Bundesliga on 16 May 2015.

Players

Team

Transfers

In

Out

Results

3. Liga

League table

Results summary

Result round by round

Matches

DFB-Pokal

Niederrheinpokal

Friendlies

Squad statistics

Statistics
Updated as of 23 May 2015.

|}

Discipline

References

External links

Duisburg
MSV Duisburg seasons